is a Japanese word meaning "iron man". It may refer to:

Tetsujin 28-go, a 1956 comic book written and illustrated by Mitsuteru Yokoyama
Tetsujin Tiger Seven, a 1973 television series produced by P Productions
Uchuu Tetsujin Kyodain, a 1976 television series created by Shotaro Ishinomori and Toei Company
Daitetsujin 17, a 1977 television series created by Shotaro Ishinomori and Toei Company
Andy Hug (1964–2000), Swiss muay thai, kyokushinkai and K-1 fighter
Tetsujin (Tekken), a fictional character in the Tekken video game series
Iron Angel of the Apocalypse, a video game series on the 3DO Interactive Multiplayer known as Tetsujin in Japan
"Tetsujin", a track by Juno Reactor and Don Davis for The Matrix Revolutions, available on its soundtrack album
PC-FX, a video game console from NEC based on 32-bit "Tetsujin" architecture